Fr. Lorenzo Cadieux, SJ (November 10, 1903 – 1976) was a Canadian Jesuit priest, historian and academic.

Born in Granby, Quebec, he was educated in Montreal, Quebec and Edmonton, Alberta, studying literature, philosophy, theology and history, and was ordained in 1924.

In 1940, he moved to Sudbury, Ontario to teach history at Collège Sacré-Coeur, which became part of Laurentian University in 1960. Cadieux served as head of the history faculty at Laurentian until his retirement in 1972. He also founded the Société historique du  Nouvel-Ontario in 1942, a historical society which pursued historical research relating to Northern Ontario. Cadieux was especially noted as one of the major early chroniclers of Franco-Ontarian history.

He also served as president of the Canadian Society of History in 1960. There is a Cadieux Lane in Sudbury named in his honour.

1903 births
1976 deaths
Canadian male non-fiction writers
20th-century Canadian Jesuits
Academic staff of Laurentian University
People from Granby, Quebec
Writers from Greater Sudbury
Writers from Quebec
French Quebecers
Franco-Ontarian people
20th-century Canadian historians